Mollie Elaine Hunt (29 July 1936 – 2 February 2018) was an English cricketer who played as a right-handed batter and right-arm off break bowler. She appeared in 3 Test matches for England in 1960 and 1961, all against South Africa. She mainly played domestic cricket for Kent.

References

External links
 
 

1936 births
2018 deaths
Cricketers from Leeds
England women Test cricketers
Kent women cricketers